Cornelis Pieter "Kees" van Dijk (25 July 1931 – 29 December 2008) was a Dutch politician of the Christian Historical Union (CHU) party and later the Christian Democratic Appeal (CDA) party and  economist.

Van Dijk worked as student researcher at the Erasmus University Rotterdam from June 1954 until July 1956. Van Dijk worked as an accountant at a bank in Johannesburg from July 1956 until April 1961 and as a civil servant for the Ministry of Foreign Affairs as an attaché in the Netherlands New Guinea from April 1961 until October 1962. Van Dijk worked as a financial analyst for the Organisation for Economic Co-operation and Development (OECD) in Paris from October 1962 until February 1968 and the World Bank in Washington, D.C. from February 1968 until June 1977. Van Dijk also worked as a teacher for the intelligence and security agency Domestic Security Service (BVD) from August 1963 until December 1967. Van Dijk was elected as a Member of the House of Representatives after the election of 1977, taking office on 8 June 1977. After the election of 1981 Van Dijk was appointed as Minister for Development Cooperation in the Cabinet Van Agt II, taking office on 11 September 1981. The Cabinet Van Agt II fell just seven months into its term on 12 May 1982 and continued to serve in a demissionary capacity until it was replaced by the caretaker Cabinet Van Agt III with Van Dijk continuing as Minister for Development Cooperation, taking office on 29 May 1982. After the election of 1982 Van Dijk returned as a Member of the House of Representatives, taking office on 16 September 1982. Following the cabinet formation of 1982 Van Dijk was not giving a ministerial post in the new cabinet and the Cabinet Van Agt III was replaced by the Cabinet Lubbers I on 4 November 1982. After the election of 1986 Van Dijk was appointed as Minister of the Interior in the Cabinet Lubbers II, taking office on 14 July 1986. Van Dijk took a medical leave of absence from 26 January 1987 until 6 May 1987 during which Minister of Justice Frits Korthals Altes served as acting Minister of the Interior from 26 January 1987 until 3 February 1987 followed by Minister of Social Affairs and Employment Jan de Koning from 3 February 1987 until 6 May 1987. In April 1989 Van Dijk announced that he would not stand for the election of 1989.

Van Dijk remained in active politics, he was elected as a Member of the Senate after the Senate election of 1991, serving from 11 June 1991 until 8 June 1999. Van Dijk also became active in the private sector and public sector and occupied numerous seats as a corporate director and nonprofit director on several boards of directors and supervisory boards (Douwe Egberts, Netherlands Economic Institute, Edmund Burke Foundation, Stichting Pensioenfonds Zorg en Welzijn, International Statistical Institute, European Cultural Foundation and Smit International) and served on several state commissions and councils on behalf of the government (Scientific Council for Government Policy, Advisory Council for Spatial Planning and the Netherlands Foreign Investment Agency).

Van Dijk was known for his abilities as a debater and manager. Van Dijk continued to comment on political affairs until his death.

Decorations

References

External links

  Drs. C.P. (Kees) van Dijk Parlement & Politiek
  Drs. C.P. van Dijk (CDA) Eerste Kamer der Staten-Generaal

1931 births
2008 deaths
Businesspeople from Rotterdam
Christian Democratic Appeal politicians
Christian Historical Union politicians
Commandeurs of the Légion d'honneur
Dutch accountants
Dutch bankers
Dutch corporate directors
Dutch expatriates in France
Dutch expatriates in Indonesia
Dutch expatriates in South Africa
Dutch expatriates in the United States
Dutch financial analysts
Dutch members of the Dutch Reformed Church
Dutch nonprofit directors
Erasmus University Rotterdam alumni
Academic staff of Erasmus University Rotterdam
Grand Officers of the Order of Leopold II
Grand Officers of the Order of Orange-Nassau
Knights Commander of the Order of Merit of the Federal Republic of Germany
Knights of the Order of the Netherlands Lion
Members of the House of Representatives (Netherlands)
Members of the Scientific Council for Government Policy
Members of the Senate (Netherlands)
Ministers of the Interior of the Netherlands
Ministers for Development Cooperation of the Netherlands
Municipal councillors of Rotterdam
OECD officials
Protestant Church Christians from the Netherlands
World Bank people
20th-century Dutch businesspeople
20th-century Dutch civil servants
20th-century Dutch economists
20th-century Dutch educators
20th-century Dutch politicians
21st-century Dutch civil servants
21st-century Dutch economists
21st-century Dutch politicians